Tinku Acharya is an Indian computer scientist and a Fellow of IEEE.

He is the founder of Videonetics Technology Private Limited and known as an inventor, entrepreneur, scientist, teacher, author, and internationally acclaimed technologist.

Early life and education
Tinku Acharya was born in Howrah, West Bengal, India. He received his BSc, BTech and MTech in CS from the Calcutta University in 1987. He completed PhD in Computer Science from the Central Florida University in 1994, USA with specialization in VLSI Architectures and Algorithms for Data Compression.

Scientific career
Tinku Acharya is a computer scientist with an international reputation on Artificial intelligence, Computer Vision, Electronic Imaging, Video Processing, VLSI Architectures and Algorithms, JPEG 2000, Image and video compression

From 1996 to 2002, Acharya worked at Intel Corporation USA. He led several R&D and algorithm development teams in Intel Corporation (USA) to develop digital camera, electronic imaging systems and reprographics architecture for color photocopiers, and high-performance VLSI architectures. In late 90's, he developed the 'key image processing chain’ to map them into a small foot-print silicon for first dual-mode digital camera (Intel Corporation, USA).

During 1998 to 2002, he was an adjunct professor in the Department of Electrical engineering, Arizona State University, Tempe, Arizona. And Adjunct Professor at IIT Kharagpur in Electronics & Electrical Communication Engineering.

Tinku Acharya also served JPEG 2000 Standard Committee of in the US National Body in the International Organization for Standardization. He wrote the first book on JPEG 2000 Standard of this scalable image compression for its VLSI and software implementations.

Acharya started Videonetics in 2008, an artificial intelligence and deep learning-powered video computing platform company selected as Technology Pioneer by World Economic Forum.

Acharya contributed in modern enterprise-class Video Management System, Intelligent Video Analytics applications, and an Artificial Intelligence-based Unified Video Computing Platform.

Acharya worked at AT&T Labs, USA before joining Intel Corporation. He also served as the Director – IT at Intellectual Ventures from 2008 to 2012.

Acharya has collaborated with Eastman Kodak, Indian Statistical Institute Indian Institute of Science and many more.

Tinku Acharya participates and contributes in many activities promoting and advancement of science and technology in various fields in India. He is a member of the Research Advisory Board of National Council of Science Museums, Ministry of Culture, Govt. of India. He is also Governing Body Member of the Technology Innovation Hub at the Indian Institute of Technology Patna.

He was recognized by the Member of Congress, House of Representatives, Mr. Jeff Flake from Arizona, USA in 2002 for his contributions in intellectual property development in the state of Arizona.

Invention

Acharya holds more than 175 U.S. and International patents in data compression, electronic imaging, multimedia computing, intelligent video, computer vision, artificial intelligence and VLSI Signal Processing and architectures.

Acharya introduced the concept of "Sixel" (Sensory Elements) to unify multiple heterogenous types of sensory data into a single data structure like static image or motion pictures (video) to process all correlated sensory data using single analytical processing framework.

He is an expert in Intelligent Video processing, Artificial Intelligence, Video IoT (Internet of Things) and their pragmatic mapping in various multicore computing architectures and VLSI, actively engaged and influenced the development of today's Intelligent Video Analytics and Scalable Intelligent Video Management System since early 2000's

Bibliography
"Image Processing: Principles and Applications" (John Wiley & Sons, 2005), ISBN 9780471745785, Tinku Acharya, Ajoy K. Ray, p:448
"JPEG2000 Standard for Image Compression: Concepts, Algorithms and VLSI Architectures" (John Wiley & Sons, 21 January 2005), ISBN 9780471653752, Tinku Acharya, Ping-Sing Tsai, p:296 
"Information Technology: Principles and Applications" (Prentice-Hall India, 2004), ISBN 9788120321847, Ajoy Kumar Ray, Tinku Acharya, p:628, 
"Data Mining: Multimedia, Soft Computing and Bio-informatics" (John Wiley & Sons, 2005), ISBN 0471474886, Sushmita Mitra, Tinku Acharya, p:424

Awards and recognition
Acharya received many awards and recognition during his career. Some of the notables are as follows. 
Acharya was elevated to the status of IEEE Fellow in 2010 for his "contribution to the advancement of large scale integration algorithms and architectures for electronic image processing."
In 2010, Acharya was the first recipient of the Acharya Prafulla Chandra Ray Memorial Award from the Institute of Pulmocare and Research for achievements in science and entrepreneurship.
2009 NASI-Reliance Platinum Jubilee Award from the National Academy of Sciences, India for Innovation in Physical Sciences’.
In 2008, he received the ‘Engineer of the Year’ award from IEEE Phoenix, USA and ‘Outstanding Engineer’ award from IEEE Southwest Region, US.
Tinku Acharya was recognized as the ‘Most Prolific Inventor’ in Intel Corporation (worldwide) twice in 1999 & 2001.

References

External links
 Google Scholar Citations page
 Tinku Acharya on ResearchGate
 Tinku Acharya on Academia

Fellow Members of the IEEE
Scientists from West Bengal
Indian computer scientists
Bengali scientists
University of Calcutta alumni
Year of birth missing (living people)
Living people